Arbol Solo is an H chondrite meteorite that fell to earth on September 11, 1954, in the province of San Luis, Argentina.

Classification
It is classified as H5-ordinary chondrite.

References

See also 
 Glossary of meteoritics
 Meteorite falls
 Ordinary chondrite

Meteorites found in Argentina
1954 in Argentina